Pit Pony is a 1999 CBC television series which tells the story of small-town life in Glace Bay, on the island of Cape Breton, Nova Scotia in 1904.  The plot line revolves around the lives of the families of the men and boys who work in the coal mines.

Production
Stories in the series were written by Heather Conkie, Paul Ledoux, Edwina Follows and Lori Houzer.  It is based on the award-winning 1997 Canadian television film inspired by Joyce Barkhouse's novel of the same name.

The series, like the film, was produced by Cochran Entertainment. The series was directed by Mike Clattenburg, Stephen Reynolds, and Peter Rowe. 70% of the cast and crew were from Cape Breton and 20% were from other regions of Nova Scotia.

In June 1999, production began for the second season of Pit Pony. However, the series was subsequently cancelled on February 4, 2000.

Telecast and home media
Pit Pony premiered on the Canadian CBC on February 5, 1999, and ended on February 4, 2000. It ran for two seasons with 44 episodes. The Gemini Award-winning series airs in the US on the Encore. The series is now streaming on Tubi.

Plot summary
Set in the small Nova Scotia mining town of Glace Bay in the early 1900s, the series revolves around the lives and work of the town's male population, virtually all of whom were employed by the local coal mine, and the trials and tribulations of the women of the town, who waited anxiously to see if their loved ones would return home safely.

In particular, the plot line focuses on the story of the MacLean family.  Willie MacLean is a 12-year-old boy with a love for horses and liking to school to escape the difficult times his family has. When the series begins, Willie's father has been dead for over a year from coal consumption, and his older brother, John also died in a mine cave in. When Willie's brother was killed in a cave in and his father wounded two or three years earlier (in the Pit Pony television film), Willie was forced to fill his brother's shoes to support his older sister Nellie, and two younger sisters, Maggie and Sarah, until their father recovered. Willie found work at the mine lonely and unfriendly; as a result he forms a bond with a pit pony horse in order to make it through each day.

The principal characters included the members of the MacLean and Hall families: Alex Wrathell as young Willie MacLean, through whose eyes most of the stories unfolded around, Jennie Raymond as Willie's older sister Nellie MacLean Hall, Shaun Smyth as Nellie's Scott husband Ned Hall. Elliot Page played Maggie MacLean, and Anna Wedlock played Sarah MacLean, Willie's two younger sisters. This was Page's first acting role and he was scouted by John Dunsworth for the role.  Among the other major characters were Willie's surrogate father and stable owner Charley (Denny Doherty), town gossip Lorena MacTavish (Mary-Colin Chisholm) and the firm, but fair, mine owner Mr. Frawley (Jeremy Akerman).

Episodes

Season 1: 1999

Season 2: 1999–2000

Awards and nominations

Gemini Awards

Broadcast
In the United States, Starz Kids & Family is currently airing the series in every odd-numbered month.

References

External links
 
 

CBC Television original programming
1999 Canadian television series debuts
2000 Canadian television series endings
Television shows set in Nova Scotia
1990s Canadian drama television series
2000s Canadian drama television series